Protein digestibility-corrected amino acid score (PDCAAS) is a method of evaluating the quality of a protein based on both the amino acid requirements of humans and their ability to digest it.

The PDCAAS rating was adopted by the US FDA and the Food and Agriculture Organization of the United Nations/World Health Organization (FAO/WHO) in 1993 as "the preferred 'best'" method to determine protein quality.

In 2013, FAO proposed changing to Digestible Indispensable Amino Acid Score.

Methodology
Using the PDCAAS method, the protein quality rankings are determined by comparing the amino acid profile of the specific food protein against a standard amino acid profile with the highest possible score being a 1.0. This score means, after digestion of the protein, it provides per unit of protein 100% or more of the indispensable amino acids required.

The formula for calculating the PDCAAS percentage is: (mg of limiting amino acid in 1 g of test protein / mg of same amino acid in 1 g of reference protein) x fecal true digestibility percentage.

The PDCAAS value is different from measuring the quality of protein from the protein efficiency ratio (PER) and the biological value (BV) methods. The PER was based upon the amino acid requirements of growing rats, which differ significantly from those of humans. The PDCAAS allows evaluation of food protein quality based on the needs of humans as it measures the quality of a protein based on the amino acid requirements (adjusted for digestibility) of a 2- to 5-year-old child (considered the most nutritionally demanding age group). The BV method uses nitrogen absorption as a basis. However, it does not take into account certain factors influencing the digestion of the protein and is of limited use for application to human protein requirements because what is measured is maximal potential of quality and not a true estimate of quality at requirement level. Nevertheless, BV can be used to assess requirements of protein derived from foods with known quality differences and measure the proportion of absorbed nitrogen which is retained and presumably used for protein synthesis as an accurate indicator for protein measurement.

The FDA gave two reasons for adopting the PDCAAS in 1993: 1) PDCAAS is based on human amino acid requirements, which makes it more appropriate for humans than a method based on the amino acid needs of animals. 2) The Food and Agricultural Organization/World Health Organization (FAO/WHO) had previously recommended PDCAAS for regulatory purposes.

Limitations

Digestion
Amino acids that move beyond the terminal ileum in the body are less likely to be absorbed for use in protein synthesis. They may pass out of the body or become absorbed by bacteria, thus appearing to have been digested instead of being present in the feces. The PDCAAS takes no account of where the proteins have been digested.

Similarly, amino acids that are lost due to antinutritional factors present in many foods are assumed to be digested according to the PDCAAS.

Due to this, in 2013, the FAO proposed changing to Digestible Indispensable Amino Acid Score.

Focus on single proteins
The PDCAAS method may also still be considered incomplete, since human diets, except in times of famine, almost never contain only one kind of protein. However, calculating the PDCAAS of a diet solely based on the PDCAAS of the individual constituents is impossible, because one food may provide an abundance of an amino acid that the other is missing, in which case the PDCAAS of the diet is higher than that of any one of the constituents. To arrive at the final result, all individual amino acids would have to be taken into account, though, so the PDCAAS of each constituent is largely useless.

For example, grain protein has a PDCAAS of about 0.4 to 0.5, limited by lysine. On the other hand, it contains more than enough methionine. White bean protein (and that of many other pulses) has a PDCAAS of 0.6 to 0.7, limited by methionine, and contains more than enough lysine. When both are eaten in roughly equal quantities in a diet, the PDCAAS of the combined constituent is 1.0, because each constituent's protein is complemented by the other.

A more extreme example would be the combination of gelatine (which contains virtually no tryptophan and thus has a PDCAAS of 0) with isolated tryptophan (which, lacking all other essential amino acids, also has a PDCAAS of 0). Despite individual scores of 0, the combination of both in adequate amounts has a positive PDCAAS, with the limiting amino acids isoleucine, threonine, and methionine. Further, according to a 2000 study by Gerjan Schaafsma, "The questions about the validity of the amino acid scoring pattern and the application of the true fecal rather than the true ileal digestibility correction, as well as the truncation of PDCAAS values warrant a critical evaluation of PDCAAS in its current form as a measure of protein quality in human diets." Also, the scientific community has raised critical questions about the validity of PDCAAS (the validity of the preschool-age child amino acid scoring pattern, the validity of the true fecal digestibility correction and the truncation of PDCAAS values to 100%).

Capped score
In addition, the fact that four proteins, all with different amino acid profiles, receive identical scores of 1.0 limits its usefulness as a comparative tool. Since they have different compositions, it is natural to assume that they perform differently in the human body and should have different scores. In short, this method, however, gives no distinction of their performance relative to each other, because after they pass a certain point, they are all capped at 1.0 and receive an identical rating. This is because in 1990 at a FAO/WHO meeting, it was decided that proteins having values higher than 1.0 would be rounded or "leveled down" to 1.0 as scores above 1.0 are considered to indicate the protein contains essential amino acids in excess of the human requirements.

Reference pattern

This reference pattern is based on the essential amino acid requirements for preschool children aged 1–3 years as published in Dietary Reference Intakes for Energy, Carbohydrate, Fiber, Fat, Fatty Acids, Cholesterol, Protein, and Amino Acids (2005). Adults aged 18+ will have slightly lower requirements.

Example values
A PDCAAS value of 1 is the highest, and 0 the lowest. The table shows the ratings of selected foods. (others)

See also
 Amino acid score
 Protein quality
 Net protein utilization
 Nitrogen balance

References

   Detailed Anaysis and Study of Collagen Protein Synthesis and Absorption from an industry source, all content unverified

Nutrition
Proteins